Y box binding protein 1 also known as Y-box transcription factor or nuclease-sensitive element-binding protein 1 is a protein that in humans is encoded by the YBX1 gene.

Clinical significance 

YBX1 is a potential drug target in cancer therapy. YB-1 helps the replication of adenovirus type 5, a commonly used vector in gene therapy. Thus, YB-1 can cause an "oncolytic" effect in YB-1 positive cancer cells treated with adenoviruses.

Interactions 

Y box binding protein 1 has been shown to interact with:

 ANKRD2, 
 CTCF, 
 P53,
 PCNA, 
 RBBP6,  and
 SFRS9.

References

Further reading

External links 
 

Transcription factors